"Another Christmas (Old Borego)" is a Holiday song written and recorded by the alternative rock band Switchfoot. The song was originally featured exclusively as one of the tracks on KROQ-FM's annual Christmas compilation CDs, "Kevin & Bean's Christmastime in the 909," which was released in 2004.

Re-release
In 2008, Switchfoot re-released the song as a Rhapsody-exclusive single, just in time for the Holiday season, under their independent record label, lowercase people records. It was rearranged with slightly more instrumentation and a more tinkly feel with the guitar work, along with an overall updated mix.

References

External links

2008 singles
Switchfoot songs
Songs written by Jon Foreman
2003 songs